Albinas "Albin" Elskus (1926–2007) was a Lithuanian-American educator and artist, known for creating works of stained glass.

Early life 
Elskus was born in Kaunas, Lithuania in 1926. During the Occupation of the Baltic states, Elskus fled to Germany to avoid being conscripted into the Soviet Army. Elskus began studying architecture in Darmstadt and painting at the Arts et Métiers ParisTech.

Career 
Elskus immigrated to Chicago, Illinois in 1949 and worked as an apprentice in a stained glass studio. After settling in a predominantly Lithuanian neighborhood, Elskus travelled to Paris to study at the École des Beaux-Arts. Elskus eventually returning to the United States and married Ann (née Crewdson). They settled in New York City, where Elskus continued to create stained glass pieces. Elskus was commissioned to created works for churches in the United States and Europe, including several in Maine.

Elskus taught art courses at the Haystack Mountain School of Crafts in Deer Isle, Maine and Pilchuck Glass School in Stanwood, Washington. He also taught at the Parsons School of Design and Fordham University.

Personal life 
Elskus and his wife had three children. He died on February 8, 2007, in Chamberlain, Maine at the age of 80.

See also
List of Lithuanian painters

References

1926 births
2007 deaths
20th-century Lithuanian painters
Soviet emigrants to the United States
American expatriates in France
Parsons School of Design faculty
Fordham University faculty